Fraus furcata is a moth of the family Hepialidae. It is endemic to Western Australia.

References

Moths described in 1989
Hepialidae